Around the World in Seventy-Two Days is an 1890 book by journalist Elizabeth Jane Cochrane, writing under her pseudonym, Nellie Bly. The chronicle details her 72-day trip around the world, which was inspired by the 1873 book Around the World in Eighty Days by Jules Verne.  She carried out the journey for Joseph Pulitzer's tabloid newspaper, the New York World.

Journey
In 1888, Bly suggested to her editor at the New York World that she take a trip around the world, attempting to turn the fictional Around the World in Eighty Days into fact for the first time. A year later, at 9:40 a.m. on November 14, 1889, she boarded the Augusta Victoria, a steamer of the Hamburg America Line, and began her  journey with the goal of finishing in 75 days.

She brought with her the dress she was wearing, a sturdy overcoat, several changes of underwear and a small travel bag carrying her toiletry essentials. She carried most of her money (£200 in English bank notes and gold in total as well as some American currency) in a bag tied around her neck.

The New York newspaper Cosmopolitan sponsored its own reporter, Elizabeth Bisland, to beat the time of both Phileas Fogg and Bly. Bisland would travel the opposite way around the world.  Bly, however, did not learn of Bisland’s journey until reaching Hong Kong.  She dismissed the cheap competition. "I would not race," she said.  "If someone else wants to do the trip in less time, that is their concern."

To sustain interest in the story, the World organized a "Bly Guessing Match" in which readers were asked to estimate Bly's arrival time to the second, with the Grand Prize consisting at first of a free trip to Europe and, later on, spending money for the trip.

On her travels around the world, Bly went through England; France, where she met Jules Verne in Amiens; Brindisi in southern Italy; the Suez Canal; Colombo in Ceylon; the Straits Settlements (British territories) of Penang and Singapore on the Malay Peninsula; Hong Kong; and Japan. The development of efficient submarine cable networks and the electric telegraph allowed Bly to send short progress reports, though longer dispatches had to travel by regular post and were thus often delayed by several weeks.

Bly travelled using steamships and the existing railroad systems, which caused occasional setbacks, particularly on the Asian leg of her race. During these stops, she visited a leper colony in China and she bought a monkey in Singapore.

Homecoming
As a result of rough weather on her Pacific crossing, she arrived in San Francisco on the White Star liner Oceanic on January 21, two days behind schedule. However, World owner Pulitzer chartered a private train to bring her home, and she arrived back in New Jersey on January 25, 1890, at 3:51 p.m.

The Miss Nellie Bly Special was a one-time, record-breaking passenger train operated by the Atchison, Topeka and Santa Fe Railway from San Francisco, California to Chicago, Illinois for reporter Nellie Bly. The train was chartered by Bly's employer, New York World owner Joseph Pulitzer.  Bly sought to best the fictional record of Phileas Fogg as documented in Jules Verne's novel Around the World in Eighty Days. Bly began her trek eastward from New York City (pausing in Paris long enough to interview Verne) in November 1889, arriving in San Francisco on January 21, 1890.

The specially missioned train set new speed records over the line, completing the  journey in 69 hours, averaging  in the process. Along the way, Bly presented each division superintendent with a quart of Mumm's Extra Dry Champagne. In the end, Bly's trip around the world took just 72 days.

Bly arrived back in New York 72 days, 6 hours, and 11 minutes after leaving Hoboken.  At the time, Bisland was still going around the world. Like Bly, she had missed a connection and had to board a slow, old ship (the Bothina) in the place of a fast ship (Etruria). Bly's journey, at the time, was a world record, though it was bettered a few months later by George Francis Train, who completed the journey in 67 days. By 1913, Andre Jaeger-Schmidt, Henry Frederick and John Henry Mears had improved on the record, the latter completing the journey in less than 36 days.

In popular culture
 In season five, episode seven, of Boardwalk Empire (set in 1931), the character Gillian Darmody reads aloud from this book, the only one she owns.

See also
A Boy Scout Around the World, a 1928 book based on a similar idea.

References

Marshall Goldberg, "The New Colossus," Diversion Books, 2014

External links 

 Nellie Bly's Book: Around the World in Seventy-Two Days, by Nellie Bly. London: Bretano's; New York: Pictorial Weeklies, 1890 at A Celebration of Women Writers
  (Audio Book)
 
 

1890 non-fiction books
American travel books
Works published under a pseudonym
Works based on Around the World in Eighty Days